This is a list of Brazilians, people in some way notable that were either born in Brazil or immigrants to Brazil (citizens or permanent residents), grouped by their area of notability.

Actors

 Zola Amaro (1890–1944), operatic soprano
 Alice Braga (born 1983)
 Alinne Moraes (born 1982)
 Ana Paula Arósio (born 1975)
 Antônio Fagundes (born 1949)
 Bete Mendes (born 1949), actor/politician
 Betty Lago (1955–2015)
 Bruno Campos (born 1973)
 Bruna Lombardi (born 1952)
 Bruna Marquezine (born 1995)
 Carolina Dieckmann (born 1978)
 Cauã Reymond (born 1980)
 Daniel Benzali (born 1950)
 Daniele Suzuki (born 1977)
 Denise Fraga (born 1964)
 Dercy Gonçalves (1907–2008), artist
 Eliane Giardini (born 1952)
 Fernanda Montenegro (born 1929) Academy Award nominee
 Fernanda Torres (born 1965)
 Fábio Assunção (born 1971)
 Fábio Lago (born 1970)
 Gianfrancesco Guarnieri (1934–2006)
 Giovanna Antonelli (born 1976)
 Glória Menezes (born 1934)
 Grande Otelo (1915–1993)
 Guilherme Berenguer (born 1980)
 Hebe Camargo (1929–2012), TV presenter, singer, actress
 José Lewgoy (1920–2003)
 José Wilker (1944–2014)
 Juliana Didone (born 1984)
 Juliana Silveira (born 1980), actress/singer
 Lázaro Ramos (born 1978)
 Leonardo Villar (1923–2020)
 Lima Duarte (born 1930)
 Lucélia Santos (born 1957)
 Malu Mader (born 1966),
 Carmen Miranda (1909–1955), singer
 Marco Nanini (born 1948)
 Maria Flor (born 1983)
 Marília Pêra (1943–2015)
 Matheus Nachtergaele (born 1968)
 Miguel Falabella (born 1956)
 Morena Baccarin (born 1979)
 Murilo Benício (born 1971)
 Natália Guimarães (born 1984), Miss Brasil 2007, actress
 Oscarito (1906–1970)
 Paola Oliveira (born 1982)
 Paulo Autran (1922–2007)
 Paulo Betti (born 1952)
 Raul Cortez (1932–2006)
 Regina Duarte (born 1947)
 Renato Aragão (born 1935)
 Reynaldo Gianecchini (born 1972)
 Rodrigo Hilbert (born 1980)
 Rodrigo Santoro (born 1975)
 Ronald Golias (1929–2005), actor and comedian
 Selton Mello (born 1972)
 Sônia Braga (born 1950)
 Taís Araújo (born 1978)
 Tarcisio Meira (1935–2021)
 Vera Fischer (born 1951)
 Wagner Moura (born 1976)
 Xuxa Meneghel (born 1963), actress, singer, TV host

Architects and urban planners 

 Affonso Eduardo Reidy (1909–1964), architect and urban planner, reformer of Rio de Janeiro
 Alexandre Chan (born 1942)
 João Batista Vilanova Artigas (1915–1985), architect and professor
 Lina Bo Bardi (1914–1992), architect
 Lúcio Costa (1902–1998), architect and urban planner, creator of Brasília
 Oscar Niemeyer (1907–2012), architect of international renown, winner of the 1988 Pritzker Prize
 Paulo Mendes da Rocha (1928–2021), architect and professor, winner of the 2006 Pritzker Prize
 Roberto Burle Marx (1909–1994), architect and landscape designer
 Jaime Lerner (1937–2021), architect and urban planner
 Ruy Ohtake (1938–2021), architect
 Marcio Kogan (born 1952), architect
 Igor de Vetyemy (born 1981), architect and professor

Artists (Visual arts)

Painters
 Alfredo Volpi (1896–1988)
 Almeida Junior (1850–1899)
 Anita Malfatti (1889–1964)
 Arthur Timotheo da Costa (1882-1922)
 Cândido Portinari (1903–1962)
 Emiliano Di Cavalcanti (1897–1976)
 Iberê Camargo (1914–1994)
 José Pancetti (1902–1958)
 Lasar Segall (1891–1957)
 Manabu Mabe (1924–1997)
 Manoel da Costa Ataíde (1762–1830)
 Tarsila do Amaral (1886–1973)
 Vicente do Rego Monteiro (1899–1970)
 Victor Meirelles (1832–1903)

Sculptors
 Antonio Francisco Lisboa "O Aleijadinho" (1730–1814), Baroque sculptor
 Sergio Rossetti Morosini, Brazilian American (born 1953), Contemporary sculptor
 Victor Brecheret (1894–1955)

Cartoonists
 Carlos Latuff (born 1968), political cartoonist
 Fábio Moon (born 1976)
 Gabriel Bá (born 1976)
 Henfil (1944–1988)
 Mauricio de Sousa (born 1935)
 Millôr Fernandes (1923–2012)
 Ziraldo (born 1932)

Others
 Abraham Palatnik (1928–2020)
 Ana Maria Pacheco (born 1943), painter and sculptor
 Artur Barrio (born 1945)
 Cybèle Varela (born 1943), painter, mixed-media artist
 Hélio Oiticica (1937–1980), painter
 Lygia Clark (1920–1988)
 Lygia Pape (1927–2004)
 Moysés Baumstein (1931–1991), holographer, painter, film/video producer
 Naza (born 1955), painter, visual artist
 Oswaldo Goeldi (1895–1961), illustrator and engraver
 Sebastião Salgado (born 1944), photographer

Athletes

Football
 Adriano (born 1982)
 Adriano (born 1985)
 Alisson Becker (born 1992)
 Bebeto (born 1964)
 Benny Feilhaber (born 1985), footballer, center/attacking midfielder (AGF Aarhus & US national team)
 Cafu (born 1970), footballer
 Casemiro (born 1992), football player for Real Madrid and three time UEFA Champions League Winner
 Dani Alves (born 1983)
 Dante (born 1983)
 David Luiz (born 1987), football player for Arsenal
 Dida (born 1973)
 Garrincha (1933–1983)
 Gabriel Barbosa (born 1996)
 Gabriel Jesus (born 1997)
 Jairzinho (born 1944)
 Lúcio (born 1978), retired footballer
 Kaká (born 1982)
 Lucas Leiva (born 1987)
 Lucas Moura (born 1992)
 Marcelo (born 1988)
 Marta (born 1986)
 Neymar (born 1992)
 Oscar (born 1991)
 Pelé (1940-2022), football player, three-time World Cup Champion
 Philippe Coutinho (born 1992), football player for FC Barcelona
 Rivaldo (born 1972)
 Rivelino (born 1946)
 Roberto Carlos (born 1973), 2002 FIFA World Cup Champion
 Roberto Firmino (born 1991), footballer, Liverpool FC
 Robinho (born 1984)
 Rodrigo Caio (born 1993)
 Rogério Ceni (born 1973)
 Romário (born 1966)
 Ronaldinho (born 1980), footballer, two-time FIFA World Player of the Year
 Ronaldo (born 1976), footballer, two-time World Cup champion
Taffarel (born 1966), 1994 FIFA World Cup Champion
 Thiago Silva (born 1984), football player for Chelsea F.C.
 Vinícius Júnior (born 2000)
 Wesley (born 1989), footballer
 Willian (born 1988)
 Zico (born 1953), retired footballer
 Zizinho (1921–2002), retired footballer

Basketball
 Anderson Varejão (born 1982), former NBA player
 Bruno Caboclo (born 1995), NBA player
 Fab Melo (1990–2017), former NBA player
 Leandro Barbosa (born 1982), NBA champion
 Marcelo Huertas (born 1983), professional basketball player
 Nenê Hilário (born 1982), NBA player
 Oscar Schmidt (born 1958), retired basketball player
 Raul Neto (born 1992), NBA player
 Tiago Splitter (born 1985), NBA champion

Volleyball
 Adriana Behar (born 1969), volleyball, beach player; two-time Olympic silver; Pan American champion; two-time world champion
 Alison Cerutti (born 1985), Olympic medalist and World Champion
 Bernard Rajzman (born 1957), Olympic silver; Pan American champion; world silver
 Bruno Oscar Schmidt (born 1986), Olympic medalist and World Champion
 Bruno Rezende (born 1986), Olympic medalist and World Champion
 Giba (born 1976), eight-time World League champion
 Lucas Saatkamp (born 1986), Olympic medalist and World Champion

Judo
 Érika Miranda (born 1987) World Championship medalist
 Felipe Kitadai (born 1989), Olympic medalist
 Flávio Canto (born 1975), Olympic medalist
 Ketleyn Quadros (born 1987), Olympic medalist
 Leandro Guilheiro (born 1983), Olympic medalist
 Mayra Aguiar (born 1991), Olympic medalist and World Champion
 Rafael Silva (born 1987) two-time Olympic medalist
 Rafaela Silva (born 1992), Olympic Gold medalist and World Champion
 Sarah Menezes (born 1990), Olympic gold medalist
 Tiago Camilo (born 1982), two-time Olympic medalist and World Champion

Gymnastics
 Arthur Mariano (born 1993), Olympic medalist and World Champion
 Arthur Zanetti (born 1990),  Olympic Gold medalist and World Champion
 Daiane dos Santos (born 1983), World Champion
 Daniele Hypólito (born 1984), World Championship medalist
 Diego Hypólito (born 1986), Olympic medalist and 2x World Champion
 Flávia Saraiva (born 1999)
 Jade Barbosa (born 1991), World Championship medalist
 Rebeca Andrade (born 1999)

Swimming
 Ana Marcela Cunha (born 1992), five-time World Champion
 Bruno Fratus (born 1989), World Championship medalist
 César Cielo (born 1987), two-time Olympic medalist, Olympic and World record holder
 Daniel Dias (born 1988), swimmer, paralympian
 Fernando Scherer (born 1974), Olympic medalist
 Gustavo Borges (born 1972), Olympic medalist
 Marcelo Chierighini (born 1991), World Championship medalist
 Poliana Okimoto (born 1983), Olympic medalist
 Thiago Pereira (born 1986), Olympic medalist

Athletics
 Almir dos Santos (born 1993)
 Caio Bonfim (born 1991)
 Darlan Romani (born 1991)
 Eronilde de Araújo (born 1970), Olympic finalist in 400 meters hurdles
 Fabiana Murer (born 1981), World Champion
 Joaquim Cruz (born 1963), Olympic Gold medalist
 Maurren Maggi (born 1976), retired olympic gold medalist
 Robson Caetano (born 1964), Olympic medalist
 Thiago Braz da Silva (born 1993), Olympic Gold medalist

Auto racing
 Ayrton Senna da Silva (1960–1994), three-time Formula 1 World Champion
 Bruno Senna (born 1983), Formula One racing driver
 Christian Fittipaldi (born 1971), NASCAR driver/Indycar driver
 Emerson Fittipaldi (born 1946), Formula One two-time champion. Raced for McLaren, Lotus and Fittipaldi automotive 
 Felipe Massa (born 1981), Formula One driver, notably for Scuderia Ferrari 
 Felipe Nasr (born 1992), Formula One driver, notably for Sauber F1 Team
 Hélio Castroneves (born 1975), IndyCar driver
 Nelson Piquet (born 1952), three-time Formula One world champion, raced for Williams, Benetton, McLaren, Ensign, and Brabham
 Rubens Barrichello (born 1972), former Formula 1 driver, raced for Jordan, Stewart, Ferrari, Honda, Braun, and Williams
 Tony Kanaan (born 1974), IndyCar driver

Combat sports
 Alex Pereira (born 1987), Former Kickboxer, Mixed Martial Artist
 Amanda Nunes (born 1988), black belt in Brazilian jiu-jitsu, Current mixed martial arts Female World Champion
 Anderson Silva (born 1975), black belt in Brazilian jiu-jitsu, Former mixed martial arts World Champion
 Charles Oliveira (born 1989), black belt in Brazilian jiu-jitsu, Former mixed martial arts World Champion
 Cris Cyborg (born 1985), black belt in Brazilian jiu-jitsu, Current mixed martial arts Female World Champion
 Deiveson Figueiredo (born 1987), black belt in Brazilian jiu-jitsu, Current mixed martial arts World Champion
 Gilbert Burns (born 1986), black belt in Brazilian jiu-jitsu, mixed martial artist
 Glover Teixeira (born 1979), Former World Champion Mixed Martial Artist
 Jéssica Andrade (born 1991), Former Female Mixed Martial Artist World Champion 
 José Aldo (born 1986), Former World Champion Mixed Martial Artist
 Junior dos Santos (born 1984), Former World Champion Mixed Martial Artist
 Patricky Pitbull (born 1986), black belt in Brazilian jiu-jitsu, Current mixed martial arts World Champion
 Patrício Pitbull (born 1987), black belt in Brazilian jiu-jitsu, Current mixed martial arts World Champion
 Paulo Costa (born 1991), mixed martial artist
 Rafael dos Anjos (born 1984), black belt in Brazilian jiu-jitsu, Former mixed martial arts World Champion
 Thiago Alves (born 1983), mixed martial artist
 Lyoto Machida (born 1978), black belt in Machida Karate, Former mixed martial arts World Champion
 Marcio Navarro (born 1978), professional kickboxer and mixed martial artist
 Antônio Rodrigo Nogueira (born 1976), black belt in Brazilian jiu-jitsu, Former mixed martial arts World Champion
 Mauricio "Shogun" Rua (born 1981), black belt in Brazilian jiu-jitsu, Former mixed martial arts World Champion
 Murilo Rua (born 1980), black belt in Brazilian jiu-jitsu, Former mixed martial arts World Champion
 Wanderlei Silva (born 1976), black belt in Brazilian jiu-jitsu, Former mixed martial arts World Champion

Sailing
 Daniel Adler (born 1958), Olympic medalist
 Jorge Zarif (born 1992)
 Kahena Kunze (born 1991)
 Lars Grael (born 1964)
 Martine Grael (born 1991)
 Robert Scheidt (born 1973)

Surfing
 Adriano de Souza (born 1987)
 Filipe Toledo (born 1995)
 Gabriel Medina (born 1993)
 Ítalo Ferreira (born 1994)
 Rodrigo Koxa (born 1979)

Tennis
 Bruno Soares (born 1982)
 Fernando Meligeni (born 1971)
 Gustavo Kuerten (born 1976) three-time French Open winner
 Marcelo Melo (born 1983)
 Thiago Monteiro (born 1994)
 Thiago Seyboth Wild (born 2000)
 Thomaz Bellucci (born 1987)

Others
 Alexandre de Pontes (1968–1993), bodyboarder
 Bob Burnquist (born 1976), professional skateboarder
 Eric Maleson (born 1967), Olympic Bobsled Athlete
 Eurico Rosa Da Silva (born 1975), jockey
 Felipe Wu (born 1992), Olympic medalist in Shooting
 Hugo Calderano (born 1996)
 Isaquias Queiroz (born 1994), Olympic medalist and World Champion in Sprint Canoeing
 Kevin Alves (born 1991), figure skater
 Maicon Siqueira (born 1993), Olympic medalist in Taekwondo
 Natália Falavigna (born 1984), Olympic medalist in Taekwondo
 Robson Conceição (born 1988), Olympic medalist in Boxing
 Rodrigo Pessoa (born 1972), Olympic Champion show jumper
 Yan Gomes (born 1987), MLB player
 Yane Marques (born 1984), Olympic medalist in Modern Pentathlon

Diplomats 

 Barão do Rio Branco (1845–1912)
 Joaquim Nabuco (1849–1910)
 Luiz Martins de Souza Dantas (1876–1954)
 Oswaldo Aranha (1894–1960)
 Rui Barbosa (1849–1923)
 Walter Moreira Salles (1912–2001)
 Sérgio Vieira de Mello (1948–2003), UN representative

Film directors 

 Aluizio Abranches
 Ana Carolina (born 1945)
 Andrucha Waddington (born 1970)
 Anna Muylaert (born 1964)
 Alberto Cavalcanti (1897–1982), pioneer filmmaker
 Anselmo Duarte (1920–2009), Palme d'Or winner
 Arnaldo Jabor (born 1940), Silver Berlin Bear-winner
 Bruno Barreto (born 1955), Golden Berlin Bear-nominated director
 Cacá Diegues (born 1940)
 Cao Hamburger (born 1962)
 Carlos Reichenbach (1945–2012)
 Daniel Filho (born 1937)
 Daniela Thomas (born 1959)
 Eduardo Coutinho (1933–2014), documentary filmmaker
 Fabio Barreto (1957–2019)
 Fernando Meirelles (born 1955), Academy Award nominee
 Gabriel Mascaro (born 1983)
 Glauber Rocha (1939–1981), founder of Cinema Novo; Cannes Film Festival award-winning director
 Hector Babenco (1946–2016), Argentine-born Brazilian Academy Award-nominated director
 Heitor Dhalia (born 1970)
 Humberto Mauro (1897–1983), pioneer and inventive filmmaker
 João Moreira Salles (born 1962), documentary director
 Joaquim Pedro de Andrade (1932–1988), member of Cinema Novo
 Jorge Furtado (born 1959)
 José Mojica Marins (1936–2020), also known as Coffin Joe
 José Padilha (born 1967), Golden Berlin Bear winner
 Júlio Bressane (born 1946)
 Karim Aïnouz (born 1966)
 Kleber Mendonça Filho (born 1968)
 Leon Hirszman (1937–1987)
 Lima Barreto (1906–1982)
 Luiz de Barros (1893–1982)
 Luiz Fernando Carvalho (born 1960)
 Luís Sérgio Person (1936–1976)
 Marcelo Gomes (born 1963)
 Mário Peixoto (1908–1992), pioneer filmmaker
 Nelson Pereira dos Santos (1928–2018)
 Norma Bengell (1935–2013), director and actress
 Paulo César Saraceni (1933–2012)
 Petra Costa (born 1983) Academy Award nominee
 Roberto Farias (1932–2018)
 Roberto Santos (1928–1987)
 Rogério Sganzerla (1946–2004)
 Ruy Guerra (born in Mozambique, 1931), member of Cinema Novo
 Sérgio Machado (born 1968)
 Sérgio Rezende (born 1951)
 Suzana Amaral (1932–2020)
 Tata Amaral (born 1960)
 Walter Hugo Khouri (1929–2003)
 Walter Lima Jr. (born 1938)
 Walter Salles (born 1956), Golden Berlin Bear winner

Executives and business entrepreneurs 

 Abílio Diniz (born 1936)
 Aloysio de Andrade Faria (1920–2020)
 Andre Medici (born 1956)
 Antônio Ermírio de Moraes (1928–2014)
 Armínio Fraga (born 1957)
 Assis Chateaubriand (1892–1968)
 Arne Ragnar Enge
 Bob Falkenburg (1926–2022)
 Carlos Ghosn (born 1954)
 Carlos Alberto Sicupira (born 1948)
 Cristina Junqueira (born 1984)
 Daniel Dantas (born 1954)
 Edmond Safra (1932–1999)
 Eduardo Saverin (born 1982)
 Eike Batista (born 1956)
 Count Francesco Matarazzo (1854–1937)
 Germán Efromovich (born 1950)
 Gustavo Brigagão
 Gustavo Franco (born 1956)
 Henrique Meirelles (born 1945)
 João Carlos di Genio (born 1939)
 Jorge Paulo Lemann (born 1939)
 José Alencar (1931–2011)
 Julio Bozano (born 1936)
 Luciano Hang (born 1962)
 Luiza Trajano (born 1948)
 Marcel Herrmann Telles (born 1950)
 Mike Krieger (born 1986)
 Norberto Odebrecht (1920–2014)
 Pedro Moreira Salles (born 1959)
 Ricardo Samuel Goldstein (born 1966)
 Ricardo Semler (born 1959)
 Roberto Marinho (1904–2003)
 Samuel Klein (1923–2014)
 Victor Civita (1907–1990)
 Walter Moreira Salles (1912–2001)

Explorers and discoverers 

 Cândido Rondon (1865–1958), famous explorer and engineer
 Orlando Villas Boas (1914–2003), explorer and indigenist
 Amyr Klink (born 1955), adventurer and navigator, first solo rowing across the South Atlantic
 Sydney Possuelo (born 1940), explorer, social activist and Indian expert

Fashion designers 

 Alexandre Herchcovitch (born 1971)
 Amir Slama (Rosa Chá)
 Carlos Falchi (1944–2015)
 Carlos Tufvesson
 Clodovil Hernandes (1937–2009) (Haute-Couture)
 Francisco Costa (born 1964) (Calvin Klein)
 Ocimar Versolato (1961–2017)
 Tufi Duek (born 1954) (Fórum / Triton)
 Zuzu Angel (1921–1976)

Geologists 

 Djalma Guimarães (1895–1973, born Santa Luzia, MG, died Belo Horizonte)
 Fernando Flávio Marques de Almeida (1916–2013), one of the most outstanding geologists of the 20th century
 José Bonifácio de Andrada e Silva (1763–1838)
 Louis Agassiz (1807–1873)
 Louis de Loczy (Hungria, 1897–1980, born Brazil, Rio de Janeiro)
 Orville Adalbert Derby (1851–1915, born Kellogsville, New York, died Rio de Janeiro), American geologist who worked in Brazil, particularly for the DNPM and CPRM
 Reinhard Maack (1892–1969, born in Herford-Germany, died in Curitiba-Brazil)
 Walter K. Link (1902–1982), USA geologist; controversial organizer of oil exploration in Brazil
 Octávio Barbosa (1907–1997), Brazilian field geologist, prospector
 Heinz Ebert (1907–1983), born in Saxony, Germany, died in Rio Claro, São Paulo
 Aziz Ab'Saber (1924–2012, São Luiz do Paraitinga, São Paulo), Brazilian geoscientist
 Sérgio Estanislau do Amaral (1925–1996)
 Peter Szatmari, Hungarian geologist

Heroes and historical figures 

 Admiral Tamandaré (1807–1897), military combatant, war veteran, "father of the Navy"
 Ana Néri (1814–1880), pioneering nurse; assisted Brazilian forces on the battlefield, "mother of nursery"
 Anita Garibaldi (1821–1849), revolutionary combatant, fought in Brazil and Italy, was married to Giuseppe Garibaldi
 Ayrton Senna (1960–1994), Brazilian racing driver and a source of inspiration for many Brazilians, Formula 1
 Barão do Amazonas (1804–1882), Admiral of the Navy, war hero, led the decisive Battle of Riachuelo
 Carlos Marighella (1911–1969), marxist writer, politician and guerilla fighter
 Bento Gonçalves (1788–1847), military commander, led a separatist movement
 Chico Mendes (1944–1988), murdered rural leader and martyr of ecological movements in the Amazon
 Luís Alves de Lima e Silva, Duke of Caxias (1803–1880), military commander, nationalist leader, "father of the Army"
 José Bonifácio (1763–1838), Patriarch of the Independence
 Princess Isabel (1846–1921), Princess Imperial of Brazil, later de jure Empress of Brazil, daughter of Emperor D. Pedro II, signed the abolition of slavery in the country
 Tiradentes (1746–1792), leader of a failed conspiracy against the Portuguese, executed by hanging followed by quartering
 Tristão de Alencar Araripe (1821–1908), republican leader
 Zumbi dos Palmares (1655–1695), African-born leader of a slave revolt, killed in battle.
 Santos Dumont (1873–1932), Brazilian inventor and aeronaut
 Maria Tomásia Figueira Lima (1826-1902), aristocrat, abolitionist

Intellectuals and thinkers 

 Leonardo Boff (born 1938), friar, theologian, silenced by the Vatican due to his socialist stance
 Benjamin Constant (1836–1891), abolitionist and republican
 Raymundo Faoro (1925–2003), jurist
 Paulo Freire (1921–1997), educator and university professor
 Florestan Fernandes (1920–1995), sociologist
 Gilberto Freyre (1900–1987), sociologist
 Anna Veronica Mautner (1935–2019) psychologist, psychoanalyst, essayist and columnist Brazilian
 Pontes de Miranda (1892–1979), jurist, mathematician, philosopher and writer
 José do Patrocínio (1854–1905), liberal abolitionist and republican
 Darcy Ribeiro (1922–1997), anthropologist and educator, scientific leader and politician
 Jorge Stolfi (born 1950), computer scientist
 Milton Santos (1926–2001), geographer, writer and university professor

Mathematicians

Models

Female 

 Adriana Lima (born 1981)
 Alessandra Ambrosio (born 1981)
 Aline Weber (born 1989)
 Ana Beatriz Barros (born 1982)
 Ana Carolina Reston (1985–2006)
 Ana Claudia Michels (born 1981)
 Ana Hickmann (born 1981)
 Bruna Erhardt (born 1988)
 Bruna Tenório (born 1989)
 Camilla Finn (born 1991)
 Caroline Trentini (born 1987)
 Cintia Dicker (born 1986)
 Daiane Conterato (born 1990)
 Daniella Cicarelli (born 1978)
 Daniella Sarahyba (born 1984)
 Emanuela de Paula (born 1989)
 Fabiana Semprebom (born 1984)
 Fernanda Lessa (born 1977)
 Fernanda Motta (born 1981)
 Fernanda Tavares (born 1980)
 Flavia de Oliveira (born 1983)
 Gianne Albertoni (born 1981)
 Gisele Bündchen (born 1980), model, actress
 Isabeli Fontana (born 1983)
 Izabel Goulart (born 1984)
 Lais Ribeiro (born 1990)
 Letícia Birkheuer (born 1978)
 Luciana Curtis (born 1976)
 Luciana Gimenez (born 1969)
 Luíza Brunet (born 1962)
 Marcelle Bittar (born 1981)
 Mariana Weickert (born 1982)
 Michelle Alves (born 1978)
 Monique Olsen (born 1990)
 Raica Oliveira (born 1984)
 Raquel Zimmermann (born 1983)
 Shirley Mallmann (born 1977)
 Solange Wilvert (born 1989)
 Yasmin Brunet (born 1988)

Male 

 Evandro Soldati (born 1985)
 Francisco Lachowski (born 1991)
 Marlon Teixeira (born 1991)
 Miro Moreira (born 1984)
 Romulo Pires (born 1983)

Monarchs 

 Queen Maria I (1734–1816)
 King John VI (1767–1826)
 Emperor Pedro I (1798–1834)
 Emperor Pedro II (1825–1891)

Musicians

Classical
 Antônio Carlos Gomes (1836–1896)
 Heitor Villa-Lobos (1887–1959)

Popular
 Adoniran Barbosa (1912–1982)
 Anitta (born 1993), pop singer
 Antônio Carlos Jobim (1927–1994), composer, songwriter
 Arnaldo Antunes (born 1960)
 Astrud Gilberto (born 1940), singer
 Andre Matos (1971–2019), singer
 Andreas Kisser (born 1968), guitarist  
 Baden Powell (guitarist) (1937–2000), guitarist
 Bebel Gilberto (born 1966), singer
 Beto Guedes (born 1951)
 Caetano Veloso (born 1942), MPB singer-songwriter
 Cartola (1908–1980)
 Chico Buarque (born 1944)
 Clara Nunes (1942–1983)
 Claudia Leitte (born 1980), axé singer
 Chorão (1970–2013)
 Djavan (born 1949)
 Elis Regina (1945–1982)
 Gal Costa (born 1945)
 Gilberto Gil (born 1942)
 Herbert Vianna (born 1961)
 Ivete Sangalo (born 1972), axé singer
 João Gilberto (1931–2019), singer-songwriter, guitarist
 Jorge Ben (born 1939)
 Kelly Key (born 1983), pop/R&B singer
 Lô Borges (born 1952)
 Ludmilla (singer) (born 1995), pop singer
 Mallu Magalhães (born 1992), folk singer
 Maria Bethânia (born 1946)
 Marília Mendonça (1995–2021), sertaneja singer 
 Marisa Monte (born 1967), MPB singer
 Marcelo Falcão (born 1973)
 Milton Nascimento (born 1942)
 Ney Matogrosso (born 1941)
 Negra Li (born 1979)
 Pabllo Vittar (born 1993), pop singer
 Renato Russo (1960–1996)
 Rita Lee (born 1947)
 Sandy (born 1983), pop singer
 Tim Maia (1942–1998), singer-songwriter
 Tom Zé (born 1936)
 Yamandu Costa (born 1980), guitarist and composer

Politicians 

 
 Aécio Neves (born 1960); federal deputy by Minas Gerais; ex-president of the Federal Chamber of Deputies; ex-senator by Minas Gerais; ex-national president of Brazilian Social Democracy Party
Alfredo Sirkis (1950–2020); ex-federal deputy by Rio de Janeiro; defeated presidencial candidate
 André Franco Montoro (1916–1999); ex-governor of the state of São Paulo; ex-senator by São Paulo; ex-minister of Labour
 Adhemar de Barros (1901–1969); ex-governor of the state of São Paulo for two times; ex-mayor of the city of São Paulo
Anthony Garotinho (born 1960); ex-governor of the state of Rio de Janeiro; defeated presidential candidate
 Artur da Costa e Silva (1899–1969); ex-president of Brazil; ex-minister of War; ex-minister of Mines and Energy
Arthur do Val (born 1986); state deputy of São Paulo
 Carlos Lacerda (1914–1977), ex-governor of the state of Guanabara; ex-federal deputy by Federal District
Celso Russomanno (born 1956); federal deputy by São Paulo
 Cesar Maia (born 1945); alderman of Rio de Janeiro; ex-mayor of the city of Rio de Janeiro
Cid Gomes (born 1963); senator by Ceará; ex-governor of the state of Ceará; ex-minister of Education; ex-mayor of he city of Sobral; ex-state deputy of Ceará
Davi Alcolumbre (born 1977); president of the Federal Senate; senator by Amapá
 Dilma Rousseff (born 1947); ex-president of Brazil, impeached; ex-Chief of Staff of the Presidency; ex-minister of Mines and Energy
Deodoro da Fonseca (1827–1892); ex-president of Brazil; ex-president of São Pedro do Rio Grande do Sul Province
Eduardo Bolsonaro (born 1984); federal deputy by São Paulo; son of president of Brazil Jair Bolsonaro. He was the most voted federal deputy of the history of Brazil until today
Eduardo Campos (1965–2014); ex-governor of Pernambuco; ex-minister of Science and Technology
Eduardo Jorge Martins (born 1949); ex-federal deputy by São Paulo; defeated presidencial candidate; defeated vice-presidential candidate
Eduardo Suplicy (born 1941); ex-senator by São Paulo
Enéas Carneiro (1938–2007); ex-federal deputy by São Paulo
 Ernesto Geisel (1907–1996); ex-president of Brazil; ex-office executive of the Institutional Security Bureau (Then named the "Military Office"); ex-minister of the Superior Militar Court
Esperidião Amin (born 1947); senator by Santa Catarina; ex-governor of the state of Santa Catarina for two times; ex-mayor of the city of Florianópolis
Eurico Gaspar Dutra (1883–1974); ex-president of Brazil; ex-minister of War
 Fernando Collor de Mello (born 1949); senator by Alagoas; ex-president of Brazil, impeached; ex-governor of the state of Alagoas; ex-mayor of the city of Maceió
 Fernando Henrique Cardoso (born 1931); ex-president of Brazil; ex-senator by São Paulo; ex-minister of Exchequer; ex-minister of Foreign Affairs
Flávio Bolsonaro (born 1981); senator by Rio de Janeiro
Floriano Peixoto (1839–1895); ex-president of Brazil; ex-vice-president of Brazil; ex-president of Mato Grosso province
 Geraldo Alckmin (born 1952); ex-governor of the state of São Paulo; defeated presidential candidate for two times
 Getúlio Vargas (1882–1954); ex-president of Brazil; ex-governor of the state of Rio Grande do Sul; ex-senator by Rio Grande do Sul; ex-minister of Exchequer
 Golbery do Couto e Silva (1911–1987); ex-Chief of Staff of the Presidency
Hamilton Mourão (born 1953); vice-president of Brazil
Jânio Quadros (1917–1992); ex-president of Brazil; ex-governor of the state of São Paulo; ex-mayor of the city of São Paulo
 Jair Bolsonaro (born 1955); former president of Brazil; army officer, ex-federal deputy by Rio de Janeiro
Joice Cristina Hasselmann (born 1978); federal deputy by São Paulo
João Amoêdo (born 1962); national president of New Party; defeated presidential candidate
João Doria (born 1957); governor of the state of São Paulo; ex-mayor of the city of São Paulo
João Goulart (1919–1976); ex-president of Brazil, deposed by a coup; ex-vice-president of Brazil; ex-minister of Labour, Industry and Trade
 José Bonifácio de Andrada e Silva (1763–1838); ex-minister of Foregin Affairs; hero of independence
José Dirceu (born 1946); ex-Chief of Staff of the Presidency; ex-federal deputy by São Paulo; ex-state deputy of São Paulo; ex-national president of Worker's Party
José Sarney (born 1930); ex-president of Brazil; ex-vice-president of Brazil; ex-president of the Federal Senate; ex-governor of the state of Maranhão; ex-senator by Maranhão; ex-senator by Amapá
 Júlio Prestes (1882–1946); ex-president of Brazil, did not take office; ex-governor of the state of São Paulo
 Juscelino Kubitschek (1902–1976); ex-president of Brazil; ex-governor of the state of Minas Gerais
Kim Kataguiri (born 1996); federal deputy by São Paulo
Leonel Brizola (1922–2004); ex-governor of the state of Rio de Janeiro; ex-governor of the state of Rio Grande do Sul
Luciana Genro (born 1971); ex-federal deputy by Rio Grande do Sul; defeated presidential candidate; daughter of Tarso Genro - Socialism and Liberty Party (PSOL)
Luís Carlos Prestes (1898–1990); ex-senator by Federal District; ex-general secretary of Brazilian Communist Party
 Luiz Inácio Lula da Silva (born 1945); president of Brazil
Manuela d'Ávila (born 1981); ex-federal deputy by Rio Grande do Sul; ex-state deputy of Rio Grande do Sul; defeated vice-presidential candidate - Communist Party of Brazil (PCdoB)
Marcelo Freixo (born 1967); federal deputy by Rio de Janeiro
Marielle Franco (1979–2018); ex-alderwoman of Rio de Janeiro
 Mário Covas (1930–2001); ex-governor of the state of São Paulo; ex-senator by São Paulo; ex-mayor of the city of São Paulo
Marina Silva (born 1958); national president of Sustainability Network; ex-senator by Acre; ex-minister of the Environment; defeated presidencial candidate for three times
 Marta Suplicy (born 1945); ex-vice-president of the Federal Senate; ex-senator by São Paulo; ex-minister of Culture; ex-minister of Turism; ex-mayor of the city of São Paulo
 Michel Temer (born 1940); ex-president of Brazil; ex-vice-president of Brazil; ex-president of the Federal Chamber of Deputies
Miguel Arraes (1916–2005); ex-governor of the state of Pernambuco; ex-mayor of the city of Recife
Oswaldo Aranha (1894–1960); ex-president of the United Nations General Assembly; ex-governor of the state of Rio Grande do Sul; ex-minister of Foreign Affairs; ex-minister of Exchequer; ex-minister of Justice
Paulo Maluf (born 1931); ex-governor of the state of São Paulo; ex-mayor of the city of São Paulo
Prudente de Morais (1841–1902); ex-president of Brazil; ex-president of the Federal Senate; ex-governor of the state of São Paulo
Rodrigo Maia (born 1970); president of the Federal Chamber of Deputies; federal deputy by Rio de Janeiro
Romário (born 1966); senator by Rio de Janeiro; ex-federal deputy by Rio de Janeiro - We Can (PODE)
Romeu Zema (born 1964); governor of the state of Minas Gerais
 Tancredo Neves (1910–1985); ex-president of Brazil, died before took office; ex-prime minister of Brazil
Tarso Genro (born 1947); ex-governor of the state of Rio Grande do Sul; ex-minister of Education; ex-minister of Justice; ex-minister of institutional relations
Djalma Bom (born 1939); founding member of the country's Workers' Party

Religious leaders 

 Antonio Conselheiro (1830–1897), also known outside Brazil as "The Counselor", founder of Canudos
 Inri Cristo (born 1948), claims to be Jesus
 Saint Anthony of Saint Anne Galvão (Friar Galvão) (1739–1822), friar, Catholic saint
 D. Helder Câmara (1909–1999), Archbishop of Olinda and Recife, a fierce defender of civil rights during the military regime
 D. Paulo Evaristo Arns (1921–2016), former Archbishop of São Paulo, also a civil rights leader
 D. Cláudio Hummes (born 1934), Bishop, Archbishop and Cardinal of São Paulo, current Mayor of the Congregation for the Clergy
 Helvécio Martins (1930–2005), General Authority of The Church of Jesus Christ of Latter-day Saints
 Chico Xavier (1910–2002), main figure of Spiritism

Journalists and TV celebrities 

 Abelardo Barbosa (1917–1988)
 Angélica (born 1973)
 Boris Casoy (born 1941)
 Eliana (born 1973)
 Fátima Bernardes (born 1962)
 Jô Soares (1938–2022)
 Maria Júlia Coutinho (born 1978)
 Rodrigo Souza Leão (1965–2009)
 Marília Gabriela (born 1948)
 Pedro Bial (born 1958)
 Silvio Santos (born 1930)
 Xuxa (born 1963)
 William Bonner (born 1963)

Writers

Fictionists
 Alfredo D'Escragnolle Taunay (1843–1871)
 Aluísio Azevedo (1857-1913)
 Clarice Lispector (1925–1977)
 Dalton Trevisan (born 1925)
 Érico Verissimo (1905–1975)
 Fernando Sabino (1923–2004)
 Graciliano Ramos (1892–1953)
 João Guimarães Rosa (1908–1967)
 Jorge Amado (1912–2001)
 José de Alencar (1829–1877)
 José Lins do Rego (1901–1957)
 Lima Barreto (1881-1922)
 Luis Fernando Veríssimo (born 1936)
 Lya Luft (born 1938)
 Lygia Fagundes Telles (1918–2022)
 Machado de Assis (1839–1908)
 Mário de Andrade (1893–1945)
 Márcio Souza (born 1946)
 Monteiro Lobato (1882–1948)
 Oswald de Andrade (1890–1954)
 Paulo Coelho (born 1947)
 Raduan Nassar (born 1935)
 Rachel de Queiroz (1910–2003)
 Raul Pompeia (1863–1895)
 Rubem Fonseca (1925–2020)

Poets
 Adélia Prado (born 1935)
 Alphonsus de Guimaraens (1870–1921)
 Álvares de Azevedo (1831–1852)
 Augusto dos Anjos (1884–1914)
 Antônio Gonçalves Dias (1823–1864)
 Carlos Drummond de Andrade (1902–1987)
 Castro Alves (1847–1871)
 Cecília Meireles (1901–1964)
 Cruz e Sousa (1861–1898)
 Ferreira Gullar (1930–2016)
 Gregório de Matos (1636–1696)
 Haroldo de Campos (1929–2003)
 Helena Kolody (1912–2004)
 João Cabral de Melo Neto (1920–1999)
 Lucila Nogueira (1950–2016)
 Manoel de Barros (1916–2014)
 Manuel Bandeira (1886–1968)
 Menotti del Picchia (1892–1988)
 Murilo Mendes (1901–1975)
 Olavo Bilac (1865–1918)
 Paulo Leminski (1944–1989)
 Tomás Antônio Gonzaga (1744–1810)
 Vinícius de Morais (1913–1980)

Playwrights
 Ariano Suassuna (1927–2014)
 Gianfrancesco Guarnieri (1934–2006)
 Maria Clara Machado (1921–2001)
 Nelson Rodrigues (1912–1980)
 Oduvaldo Vianna Filho (1936–1974)

Essayists and critics
 Alfredo Bosi (1936–2021)
 Antonio Candido (1918–2017)
 Euclides da Cunha (1866–1909)
 Otto Maria Carpeaux (1900–1978)

Science and technology

See also 
Brazilian diaspora
Brazilian Americans 
Brazilian Canadians 
List of Brazilian British people
List of Brazilian Americans 
Native Brazilians
Brazilians in France
Brazilians in the United Kingdom
Brazilians in Japan 
Afro-Brazilians

References